Pineville Mill Village Historic District is a national historic district located at Pineville, Mecklenburg County, North Carolina. The district encompasses 77 contributing buildings and 1 contributing site in a residential section of Pineville.  It was developed after 1894 and in the 1920s and consists of frame, textile mill houses.  The mill village was originally developed by the Dover Yarn Mills and later expanded by the Chadwick-Hoskins Company.

It was added to the National Register of Historic Places in 2011.

References

Houses on the National Register of Historic Places in North Carolina
Historic districts on the National Register of Historic Places in North Carolina
Houses in Mecklenburg County, North Carolina
National Register of Historic Places in Mecklenburg County, North Carolina